Money Run is the third solo studio album by American rapper Bad Azz. It was released on March 11, 2003, via Out of Bounds Entertainment/Double Dollar Sign Records. It features guest appearances from 40 Glocc, Big Hollis, Bonnie, Conflict, Kenya Baker, Marcel, LaToiya Williams, Lil' Tip Toe, Sene, Skee 64 Oz., Soopafly and Terrell Carter. The album peaked at number 85 on the Billboard Top R&B/Hip-Hop Albums chart in the United States.

Track listing

Sample credits
"California Sunshine" contains elements from "Tom's Diner" by Suzanne Vega

Chart history

References

External links

Money Run by Bad Azz on iTunes

2003 albums
Bad Azz (rapper) albums
Albums produced by Big Hollis